Eucalyptus rudderi, or Rudder's box, is a species of tree that is endemic to northern New South Wales. It has rough fibrous or flaky bark on the trunk and branches, lance-shaped adult leaves, flower buds in groups of seven, white flowers and barrel-shaped or hemispherical fruit.

Description
It has rough, fibrous or flaky grey bark on the trunk and branches. Flowering occurs from March to April and the flowers are white.

Taxonomy and naming
Eucalyptus rudderi was first formally described in 1905 by Joseph Maiden in Proceedings of the Linnean Society of New South Wales. The type specimen was collected by Augustus Rudder (1928–1904) at Cundletown. The specific epithet (rudderi) honours the collector of the type material.

Distribution and habitat
Rudder's box grows in shallow soil on steep slopes in forest in the Taree-Karuah area.

References

rudderi
Myrtales of Australia
Flora of New South Wales
Trees of Australia
Plants described in 1904